Henry Charles Howard, 18th Earl of Suffolk, 11th Earl of Berkshire (10 September 1833 – 31 March 1898), styled Viscount Andover between 1851 and 1876, was a British peer and Liberal Party politician.

Background
Suffolk was the eldest son of Charles Howard, 17th Earl of Suffolk, and Isabella Catherine, daughter of Lord Henry Thomas Howard-Molyneux-Howard.

Political career
At the 1859 general election he was elected unopposed as the Member of Parliament (MP) for the Borough of Malmesbury in Wiltshire. He was re-elected in 1865 in a two-way contest, but was defeated at the 1868 general election. In 1876 he succeeded his father as Earl of Suffolk and entered the House of Lords. He was also a member of Wiltshire County Council from 1889.

Literary
The Encyclopaedia of Sports, Edited by the Earl of Suffolk and Berkshire, Hedley Peek, and F. G. Aflalo, 2 Volumes (London: Lawrence & Bullen, 1897 and 1898)

British Library record 010885782 reports a 4-volume 1900 edition, arranged alphabetically (A to EEL, and so on).

Family
Lord Suffolk married Mary Eleanor Lauderdale, daughter of the Hon. Henry Amelius Coventry, in 1868. They had seven children:
 Lady Mary Muriel Sophie Howard (1 March 1870 – 19 February 1938), married her first cousin Henry Robert Beauclerk Coventry and had issue.
 An unnamed daughter, born in the Autumn of 1871 at St George Hanover Square, who died shortly after birth.
 Lady Eleanor Mabel Howard (11 February 1873 – 9 March 1945), married Maj. Hon. Lionel Byng, son of George Byng, 2nd Earl of Strafford, in 1902 and had issue; married Henry Atkinson in 1922
 Lady Agnes Isabel Howard (30 June 1874 – 1970), married Maj. Arthur Poynter in 1917
 Henry Molyneux Paget Howard, 19th Earl of Suffolk (1877–1917)
 Lady Katherine Millicent Howard (10 September 1883 – 1 April 1961)
 Hon. James Knyvett Estcourt Howard (1 May 1886 – 5 December 1964), married Nancy Lubbock (daughter of Edgar Lubbock and Amy Myddelton Peacock) and had issue

He died in March 1898, aged 64, and was succeeded in his titles by his eldest son, Henry. The Countess of Suffolk died in October 1928, aged 81. Among his descendants are the actor and comedian Humphrey Ker.

References

External links 

 

1833 births
1898 deaths
Henry
Henry
Henry
Andover, Henry Howard, Viscount
Andover, Henry Howard, Viscount
Andover, Henry Howard, Viscount
Suffolk, E18
Members of Wiltshire County Council
People educated at Harrow School